The Greek community in France numbers around between 35,000 - 50,000 people (in 2015). They are located all around the country but the main communities are located in Paris, Marseille and Grenoble.

Demographics

The Greeks of Marseille 

Marseille, known as Massalia in Greek, was founded by Greeks from Ionia in 600 BC. The Massaliot Greeks are believed to have introduced viticulture to France. Notable ancient Greeks from Massalia included the great explorer and scientist Pytheas.

Historically the Greek community was composed of merchants, ship-owners, intellectuals and international traders. They participated in the city’s political life or became patrons of its cultural life and the philanthropic activity of some of them was crowned by the Légion d’Honneur.

The Greeks of Corsica 

Corsican Maniots are descendants of Maniots, who migrated to Corsica during the 400 year Ottoman rule over most of Greece. To this day the Cargèse region of Corsica is referred to as Cargèse la Grecque (Cargèse, the Greek). The origins of the Greek Maniots community in Corsica dates back to the end of the 17th century, when Greece was then under Ottoman Turk rule and there was a flow of Greek refugees from the Ottoman Empire. The Maniot Greeks were settled on the island and given lands for farming and animal grazing by the then ruling power, Genoa, as part of a Genoese policy to limit the spread and impact of an emergent Corsican nationalism violently opposed to foreign rule. The Maniots founded their four new villages in Paomia with their own church and culture. As a consequence, the pro-Genoese Greeks in Corsica became the targets of sustained attacks by Corsican nationalists and resentful farmers, and so had to be re-settled several times before finally being given territory around Cargese. Attempts at integrating Greeks into Corsican society involved the establishment of a mixed Greek-Corsican gendermerie. Many Corsican Greeks subsequently left the island for French-ruled Algeria, in a wave of south European settlement of the North African colony sponsored by the French government, but returned to Corsica and elsewhere in France following Algerian independence. They have now become fully assimilated into Corsican and French society, through both intermarriage and education. In general this has resulted in Corsican Greeks losing their separate ethnic-religious identity and knowledge of the Greek language, with even older Cargese inhabitants of Greek ancestry having little if any ability to read or speak Greek, while some inhabitants still possess Corsicanized Greek names (like Garidacci etc.) and attend services in the Greek-Catholic church of Cargèse.

Notable people

Vincent, Count Benedetti
Vassilis Alexakis
Nikos Aliagas
Constantine Andreou
Anna Mouglalis
Eugène Michel Antoniadi
Roger Apéry
Antonin Artaud
Helene Ahrweiler
Kostas Axelos
Charles Denis Bourbaki
Michel Dimitri Calvocoressi
Jean-Christophe Cambadélis
Cornelius Castoriadis
André Chénier
Joseph Chénier
Iris Clert
Georges Corraface
Jacques Damala
Diam's
Dimitri from Paris
Adèle Exarchopoulos
Jean Focas
Costa Gavras
Romain Gavras
Pierre Gripari
John Iliopoulos
Laure Junot, duchess d'Abrantès
Taïg Khris
Apo Lazaridès
Clément Lépidis
Georges Moustaki
Savitri Devi Mukherji
Anna de Noailles
Gabriella Papadakis
Georges Panayotis
Nicos Poulantzas
Gisèle Prassinos
Mario Prassinos
Nicolas Rossolimo
Nicolas Sarkozy
Joseph Sifakis
Demetrio Stefanopoli
Patrick Tatopoulos
Tériade
Agnès Varda
Antonis Volanis
Antonis Rikka
Alexandre Desplat

See also
 Greek people
 Greek diaspora
 French people of Greek descent
 French-Greek relations
 Greeks in pre-Roman Gaul

References

Bibliography
Gérard Blanken, Les Grecs de Cargèse (Corse). Recherches sur leur langue et leur histoire.T. I. Partie linguistique, Leyde, 1951 (recension in Revue des études byzantines)
Marie-Anne Comnène, Cargèse: une colonie grecque en Corse, Société d'édition "Les Belles lettres", 1959, 92 pages
 Mathieu Grenet, La fabrique communautaire. Les Grecs à Venise, Livourne et Marseille, 1770-1840, Athens and Rome, École française d'Athènes and École française de Rome, 2016
Jean Coppolani, « Cargèse. Essai sur la géographie humaine d'un village corse », Revue de géographie alpine, Année 1949, Volume 37, n° 37-1, pp. 71–108
Nicolaos Stephanopoli de Comnène, Histoire de la colonie grecque établie en Corse, Éditeur A. Thoisnier-Desplaces, 1826 (full scanned version on line)

External links
  Bilateral relations between Greece and France
  A web page of the community
 Essay about the Greeks of Marseille
  Information on Greece and Greeks around the world in French

France
 
European diaspora in France
France–Greece relations